The Hadley-Ludwick House is a historic house in Las Cruces, New Mexico. It was built in 1907 for Hiram Hadley, the founder of Las Cruces College, later known as New Mexico State University. The house was designed in the Colonial Revival architectural style. It has been listed on the National Register of Historic Places since April 3, 1991.

References

		
National Register of Historic Places in Doña Ana County, New Mexico
Colonial Revival architecture in New Mexico
Houses completed in 1907
1907 establishments in New Mexico Territory